Paralacydes is a genus of moths in the family Erebidae from the Afrotropics.

Species
 Paralacydes arborifera (Butler, 1875)
 Paralacydes destrictus Kühne, 2010
 Paralacydes bomfordi (Pinhey, 1968)
 Paralacydes vocula (Stoll, 1790)

Paralacydes sensu lato species not congeneric to the Paralacydes vocula 
 Paralacydes bivittata (Bartel, 1903)
 Paralacydes fiorii (Berio, 1937)
 Paralacydes jeskei (Grünberg, 1911)
 Paralacydes minorata (Berio, 1935)
 Paralacydes ramosa (Hampson, 1907)

References
Natural History Museum Lepidoptera generic names catalog

Spilosomina
Moth genera